James C. Strouse is an American screenwriter and film director. He wrote and made his directorial debut with Grace Is Gone (2007), starring John Cusack.

Career 
He wrote the film Lonesome Jim (2005), directed by Steve Buscemi. He wrote and made his directorial debut with Grace Is Gone (2007) starring John Cusack. Strouse won an Audience Award for most popular dramatic feature and the Waldo Salt Screenwriting Award at the 2007 Sundance Film Festival for the film. He next wrote and directed the film The Winning Season (2009), starring Sam Rockwell and Emma Roberts. Strouse is a native of Goshen, Indiana and was an MFA student at Columbia University for fiction writing. His film People Places Things was released in 2015. He wrote and directed The Incredible Jessica James (2017).

He wrote and directed Love Again, an English-language remake of the 2016 German hit film SMS für Dich, starring Priyanka Chopra, Sam Heughan and Celine Dion. It is set to be released on May 12, 2023.

Filmography

References

External links

1976 births
American male screenwriters
Columbia University School of the Arts alumni
Film directors from Indiana
Living people
People from Goshen, Indiana
Screenwriters from Indiana